Robert Henry William Gray (born 21 January 1951) is a Scottish former footballer who played for Inverurie Loco Works, Torquay United and Keith, as a goalkeeper.

References

1951 births
Living people
Scottish footballers
Inverurie Loco Works F.C. players
Torquay United F.C. players
Keith F.C. players
English Football League players
Association football goalkeepers